Perrhybris lorena is a butterfly of the family Pieridae. It is found in Ecuador, Peru and Bolivia.

References

Butterflies described in 1852
Pierini
Pieridae of South America
Taxa named by William Chapman Hewitson